Simeon Courtie (born 1 April 1970) is an English broadcaster and writer. He is known as a TV presenter on Children's BBC, as a radio presenter on BFBS, and BBC local radio, a TV and radio comedy writer contributing to programmes including Have I Got News For You?, and is the author of the humorous travel book The Long and Whining Road. and the thriller All Hollow

Career
Courtie left school in 1986, aged 16, and became a City & Guilds qualified mechanical and electrical engineer, completing a 4-year apprenticeship at Timsons, a printing press manufacturer in Kettering. During this time he joined the local hospital radio station KHBA, and started volunteering at BBC Radio Northampton. In 1990 he began a full-time broadcasting career as a radio-car reporter, then as a presenter at BBC Radio Northampton.

After an unsuccessful audition at Children's BBC in 1993 he was offered a job on BBC Two pop show The O-Zone, made by the same department.  His first film, and TV debut, was an interview with Judy Cheeks directed by Andi Peters. Other pop stars he interviewed included Tom Jones, Blur and boy band World's Apart.  At the beginning of 1995 Courtie became a full-time presenter for Children's BBC hosting their new sequence on BBC Prime, before moving to BBC One where he hosted the live afternoon continuity links with the comedic puppet, Otis the Aardvark. Courtie's sense of humour combined with that of puppeteer Dave Chapman led to them gaining a cult following with older viewers, and alongside pictures drawn by children they would often show fanzines featuring them both, created by students.

Between 1996 and 2000 Courtie hosted several television shows on ITV including the live Saturday morning show Wow! and You'll Never Believe It, both produced by The Media Merchants, and Get Wet produced by Scottish Television. He presented several BBC Education series, including Working in... which gave advice to school leavers pursuing careers in various industries including engineering, construction and IT, and the Revise Wise series on Key Stage 2 English.

Between 2000 and 2005 he wrote television quiz and game show formats, which were distributed by Ludus Entertainment. He created the Channel Five show ESP and the S4C game show Risg, produced by Mentorn and presented by Siân Lloyd.

He was a regular presenter for the TV and radio station BFBS from 1997 to 2013, broadcasting to British Forces and their families around the world.  Between 2008 and 2010 he contributed as a team writer to the satirical TV comedy Have I Got News For You? where he wrote with Mark Burton, Colin Swash and Ged Parsons. He returned as a writer in 2019, credited on series 57, 58 and 59.

In 2010 he spent a year driving around the world with his family in a VW T25 camper van. They busked Beatles songs in every country from Strawberry Field in Liverpool to Strawberry Fields memorial in Central Park, all the money from which was donated to UNICEF.  He wrote a humorous account of this journey called The Long and Whining Road which was published in July 2012 by Simantics Ltd. The book was the grand prize winner of the London Book Festival 2012, an international literary competition.

In June 2013 he won a New York Festival Radio Award, with his BFBS producer Hal Stewart, for Best Radio Personality (Network/Syndicated).

In November 2013 Simeon became a regular presenter on BBC Wiltshire, presenting the daily 9-12 morning show until December 2015. In September 2015 he was the first to broadcast a full live radio programme from CERN. His final show for the station was a live outside broadcast from the Science Museum in London at the BBC Stargazing event to watch the launch of British ESA astronaut Tim Peake to the International Space Station.

In 2016 his podcast Serial Box, a satire of the global podcast hit Serial, achieved notoriety when the makers of the original Serial issued a Cease and Desist order claiming copyright infringement of the letter 'S'.

In October 2019 he published his first novel, All Hollow, a horror thriller set in the tunnels within the Rock of Gibraltar. The story is based on a screenplay he wrote in 2016 with Hal Stewart who is credited on the cover. In 2020 it won a Distinguished Favourite Independent Press Award, a Silver eLit Award, a finalist place in the 2020 International Book Awards and was shortlisted as Best Thriller finalist in the Killer Nashville Awards.

In 2020 he presented a TEDx talk entitled Aristotle the Ultimate Stand Up Comedian explaining how Aristotle's tools of rhetoric can be easily learned by remembering how a simple joke works.

Courtie founded Kindred Skills in 2020 with fellow communication skills trainers Michelle Lewis, Steve Sarossy and Marcus Webb.

Awards

For The Long and Whining Road:

London Book Festival Grand Prize Winner, 2012

USA Book News International Book Award Winner, 'Humor' category, 2013

Readers' Favorite Gold Award, 'Humour' category, 2013

IPPY Award for Independent Publishing, 'Travel' category, 2013

Shirley You Jest, winner 2013

For broadcasting:

Silver New York Festival Award, Best Radio Personality, 2013

For All Hollow:

Distinguished Favourite Independent Press Award, 2020

Silver eLit Award, 2020

International Book Awards Finalist, 2020

Best Thriller finalist, Killer Nashville Awards, 2020

Personal life
Courtie is married to former BBC journalist Jillian Moody. They have three children and live in Oxfordshire.

References

1970 births
Living people
BBC radio presenters
BBC television presenters
English broadcasters
English writers